The 2007 Memphis Tigers football team represented the University of Memphis in the 2007 NCAA Division I FBS football season. Memphis competed as a member of the Conference USA.  The team was led by head coach Tommy West.  The Tigers played their home games at the Liberty Bowl Memorial Stadium.  The Tigers finished the regular season with a 7–5 record, which was enough to attain bowl eligibility. Memphis accepted a bid to play against Florida Atlantic in the New Orleans Bowl. The Tigers lost, 44–27.

Schedule

References

Memphis
Memphis Tigers football seasons
Memphis Tigers football